RBA bank, formerly Crédit Agricole Srbija, with headquarters in Belgrade, is a member of Raiffeisen Group one of the largest banking groups in the world.

RBA bank is a Bank with a focus on Retail, Corporate and Agro activities. It is a Bank with variety of services, with a network of 74 branches and 94 ATM in Serbia. It serves private individuals, small business and corporate customers (more than 300 000 clients). CA Serbia is the 1st Bank in car loan financing, 2nd in agri-business financing, with a strong market position in housing loans in Serbia, and also recognized  as a reliable savings bank.

History
As of 14 September 2009, by the approval of the National Bank of Serbia, previous name of the bank was changed to Crédit Agricole Srbija. Initially the Bank was founded in October 1991 as a private bank called Yuco Bank with mixed capital. Since July 2005, it is majority owned by Crédit Agricole S.A. Paris, and operates under the name Meridian Bank Crédit Agricole until 2009 when it has been established under the current name.

On 5 August 2021, Raiffeisen Bank signed an agreement to acquire 100% of the shares of Crédit Agricole Srbija.

On 2 September 2022, Crédit Agricole Srbija became RBA bank as a part of the process of merging with Raiffeisen Bank. RBA bank is expected to be merged by the end of Q2 2023.

See also
 List of banks in Serbia

References

External links
 

1991 establishments in Serbia
Banks established in 1991
Banks of Serbia
Companies based in Novi Sad
Crédit Agricole subsidiaries